The October Club is an independent communist organisation made up of students at University of Oxford, founded in December 1931.

Its stated aim is to 'be a political home for radical students at the university and channel enthusiasm into building a long-term base of student-worker-community power at Oxford'. Alongside communism, it also stresses its commitment to abolition, trans-liberatory feminism, and anti-imperialism.

History

1930s

Founded with the object of ‘the study of communism in its world social, economic and cultural aspects’, within its first year it gained some 300 members out of a total population of approximately 5000 undergraduates.

Amongst its founders were Noel Carritt (of the radical Carritt family), Frank Meyer (noted American conservative thinker) and Richard Gavin Freeman (peace campaigner and judge).

Initially, it was highly critical of the Communist Party, but by the Spring of 1932, the club's core activists (approximately ten) had joined the party.

According to some contemporaries, it was largely a discussion group, attracting speakers such as H. G. Wells, Bernard Shaw, Ivor Montagu, and Shapurji Saklatvala. However, the club did take part in a number of political actions including organising a delegation to meet hunger marchers passing through Oxford on their journey from Lancashire to London, and participating in sometimes violent protests in 1933 against the rise of fascism in Oxford, both in the university and the city.

Such was the violence of this period, that, in 1933, communist and socialist students from Ruskin College founded the anti-fascist Red Shirts and volunteered to act as stewards to defend events held by the October Club.

Later in 1933, the club was banned by the university, ostensibly for its criticism of the Officers' Training Corps. In 1935, the club officially dissolved itself into the Labour Club, forming a 'popular front'.

After its dissolution, it remained as an unofficial and unrecognised society for many years.

2020s

In Trinity Term 2022, the club officially re-formed and was recognised by the SU with the stated aim to 'be a political home for radical students at the university and channel enthusiasm into building a long-term base of student-worker-community power at Oxford'.

Upon its refounding, it had no affiliation with any national communist or socialist organisation.

Notable alumni

Noel Carritt (of the radical Carritt family) 
Jack Dunman (writer and farm-worker unionist)
Richard Gavin Freeman (peace campaigner and judge)
Christopher Hill (historian)
Diana Hopkinson (writer)
Frank Meyer (American conservative political philosopher) 
François Lafitte (social researcher and abortion lobbyist)
Thora Silverthorne (co-founder of the rank-and-file nurses' union, the National Nurses Association)
R. W. Southern (historian) (non-member, but in regular attendance)
Philip Toynbee (writer, and first communist president of the Oxford Union)

See also
 Battle of Carfax
 Oxford University Labour Club
 Oxford University Liberal Democrats
 Oxford University Conservative Association
 Oxford Union

References 

Student organizations established in 1931
Student organizations established in 1935
Organizations disestablished in 1933
Organizations disestablished in 1935
Communist organizations in Europe
Clubs and societies of the University of Oxford